Ballentine (also Dickens Place) is an unincorporated community located in Panola County, Mississippi.

References

Unincorporated communities in Panola County, Mississippi
Unincorporated communities in Mississippi